Houseplant is the fifth album by drummer Jim Black's AlasNoAxis featuring clarinetist/saxophonist Chris Speed, guitarist Hilmar Jensson and bassist Skúli Sverrisson recorded in 2008 and released on the Winter & Winter label.

Reception

In his review for Allmusic, Dave Lynch said "it would be inaccurate to describe Houseplant as stifled music -- the nearly epic title track might even be heard as soundtracking the titular foliage’s dream of escape, complete with the walls tumbling down -- but at the very least Black, even with his often economical and even understated drumming here, seems intent on exploring how deeply held emotions can be expressed with a minimum of adornment". On AllAboutJazz Glenn Astarita stated "Once again, the leader and his comrades uncannily merge a cheery vibe with modern jazz improvisation and hardcore rock parameters that nicely blend into one neatly wrapped package"."

Track listing
All compositions by Jim Black
 "Inkionos" - 4:45  
 "Cahme"- 4:36  
 "Houseplant" - 7:09  
 "Fyr" - 1:05  
 "Malomice" - 7:09  
 "Littel" - 4:32  
 "Elight" - 5:55  
 "Naluch" - 5:08  
 "Cadmium Waits" - 3:25  
 "Adbear" - 7:23  
 "Lowers in a Nine Sense" - 5:03  
 "Downstrum" - 3:45

Personnel
Jim Black - drums, laptop
Chris Speed - tenor saxophone
Hilmar Jensson - electric guitar 
Skúli Sverrisson - electric bass

References

Winter & Winter Records albums
Jim Black albums
2009 albums